Þórarinsson is a surname of Icelandic origin, meaning son of Þórarinn. In Icelandic names, the name is not strictly a surname, but a patronymic. The name refers to:
Árni Þórarinsson (b. 1950), Icelandic journalist and novelist
Hjálmar Þórarinsson (b. 1986), Icelandic professional football player
Sigurður Þórarinsson (1912–1983), Icelandic geologist and vulcanologist

Icelandic-language surnames